Slave Girls from Beyond Infinity is a 1987 film that utilises the premise of the frequently-adapted 1924 short story "The Most Dangerous Game" by Richard Connell, setting it on an alien world and populating it with bikini-clad space prison escapees and weird space monsters. It was directed by Ken Dixon and stars Elizabeth Kaitan, Cindy Beal, Brinke Stevens, Don Scribner, and Carl Horner.

Plot
Daria  and Tisa, two nubile female prisoners, clad only in rough-cut rabbit skin bikinis, break out of their cell in a space gulag, overpower their guards, and escape in a shuttlecraft.

The ship mysteriously malfunctions and the girls crash land on a nearby habitable world where they become the guests of Zed, a man with a scarred face who lives in a large fortress. He is the planet’s sole sentient inhabitant and is guarded by two robots who also act as the fortress' keepers.

Given new clothes, the girls are invited to join Zed for an evening meal at his table. At dinner, the two girls meet two other survivors from another crash-landing who are also Zed’s guests, Rik and his sister Shala. They warn the girls that something is not right about Zed and that other survivors of their crash have disappeared.

A late night visit to Zed’s secret trophy room reveals all. The walls are lined with the heads of dozens of Zed’s previous guests whom he hunted for sport.

Realizing they're next, Rik and Daria sneak out into the jungle several hours before dawn to set traps and survey the area.  In the meantime, Zed takes Shala prisoner and forces himself on her to goad Rik into participating in the hunt.  Zed sends an android to ensure the guests are in bed where they're supposed to be, but Rik and Daria are still out.  Tisa intercepts the android on its way to check the rooms and distracts it by going skinny dipping.  Eventually, Zed goes up to check the rooms himself.  As Rik and Daria are coming in the window, they hear Zed approaching, strip, and jump into bed, pretending to have been having sex.  Once Zed leaves, the pretend sex becomes real lovemaking, and the two lie in bed talking about having found purpose and contentment.

The next morning, Rik is forced into the hunt and becomes Zed's trophy.  Daria and Tisa attempt to escape and are captured.  They are chained to a column with Shala and told the rules of the hunt.  The trio is then turned loose by Zed, to be hunted as game; he warns them to stay away from the "Phantom Zone".

Shala sacrifices herself to save Tisa from Zed.  Using a map, the remaining two find their way to the Phantom Zone, an ancient temple inhabited by zombie-like creatures. They find a cache of laser weapons, and return to the jungle to fight Zed, pursued by one of the creatures.  Zed knocks Daria off of a bridge over a chasm to her apparent death; unbeknownst to him, she saves herself by grabbing hold of a vine.  He returns with Tisa to his fortress where he attempts to rape her.  Daria interrupts and fights him; the monster that was pursuing her shows up, mortally wounds Zed, and attacks the women.  They manage to kill the creature and find a spaceship to escape the planet. Zed, dying from his injuries, initiates a self-destruct of his fortress but Daria and Tisa escape in time, and decide to explore the universe.

Cast
 Elizabeth Kaitan as Daria, a space prison escapee and impromptu leader
 Cindy Beal as Tisa. A space prison escapee subordinate to Daria
 Don Scribner as Zed, the hunter
 Brinke Stevens as Shala, a castaway who becomes hunted with Daria and Tisa
 Carl Horner as Rik, a castaway with a large hunting knife
 Kirk Graves as Vak, a robot
 Randoph Roehbling as Krel, a robot
 Fred Tate as Alien Mutant, a hunchbacked alien with a laser rifle for an arm

Release
The film was given a limited release theatrically in the United States by the Charles Band funded Urban Classics in September 1987.

The film was released on DVD in the United States by Cult Video, a subsidiary of Full Moon Entertainment, in 1999.

Controversy
The movie is a mix of action, drama, and comedy, and features partial female nudity, restraint, simulated sex, and mild violence. The film is intended to be a B-movie mainstream film, despite its low production budget. However, the scene depicting Daria and Rik engaged in passionate lovemaking, with some female nudity (although no genitalia is shown) as part of the character development process prior to Rik's disappearance is intentionally done for comedic value in the same style as some soft porn scenes in other movies.

Slave Girls from Beyond Infinity was specifically criticized on the floor of the U.S. Senate by Jesse Helms (R-North Carolina) in 1992. Senator Helms cited a case in which some of his constituents had accidentally stumbled onto the movie while flipping through cable channels as justification for amendments to the Cable Act of 1992. Helms wanted to force cable operators to block "indecent" programming unless customers specifically asked for it in writing. The amendment was struck down by a U.S, Federal Court in 1993 and the decision was upheld by the U.S. Supreme Court in 1996.

References

External links 
 

American comedy horror films
American science fiction films
1987 films
1980s English-language films
1980s American films